Ialibu is a small township in the Southern Highlands Province of Papua New Guinea, serving as the headquarters for the Ialibu-Pangia District. It also caters for the Imbongungu speaking people of the Imbonggu Electorate.  Ialibu is the transit point into the Kagua-Erave Electorate. The construction route of the Gulf Highway. 

The town is administered by Ialibu Urban LLG.

Culture
Ialibuans are known for weaving and selling vegetable baskets. It is one of the many ways which many rural people earn a living.

The Ialibu Museum was established in the 1990s. Languages spoken in the district are Kewabi and Immbonggu.

Some of the respected and notable personalities who have shaped Ialibu are: Turi Wari, Undi Nandi, Nandie Nanduka and Yamuna of Koromi, Walipi Apurel Kenegere, Chief Roya Yaki (Siwi-Utame former MP I-P), Ame Bote, Yer Kale, Patrick Rama, Aloysius Nale, Lepilepi Kawa, Raphael Noipo, Thomas Warua, Pawa Kombea, Roxon Undi and the former Prime Minister of Papua New Guinea Peter O'Neill. Current  PNG Defence Force Commander  Brig. Gen. Gilbert Toropo  is  also a Ialibuan.

Ialibu has produced some high-profile leaders in the country. The former Prime Minister of Papua New Guinea Mr Peter O'Neill is from the Ialibu Pangia Electorate.  The late Amb. Peter Ipu Peipul and former PNG Oppositions Leader Mr. Roy Yaki are also from the area. The sixth Governor General of PNG Sir Wiwa Korowi, is also from Ialibu.

Ialibu has produced and continues to produce many educated elites serving in the Public and Private sectors of the country including academic institutions who are actively contributing to the development of Papua New Guinea.  Among them are: Leader for MP of Ialibu Pangia & former DO Leader Chief Roya Yaki, Dr Topul Rali, Dr James Yoko, Dr Sam Kari, Dr Apo Yarepea, Dr Philip Kereme, Dr Kelly Limbiye Kelegai, Dr Kevin Pamba, Dr Paul Pumuye, Oscar Yamuna, Dike Kari, Leslie Kari, David Sode, Peter Maginde, Allen Kundi, Julius Kera, Kelly Matoli, Silas Matoli, Thimon Bune, Pius Alopea, Ambe Keleli, Major General Gilbert Toropo, Roxon Undi, Bob Marley Undi, Raphael Noipo and many other young leaders.

Pioneer woman leader in business and politics are Rombame Nandi, Ruth Walame Undi Elizabeth Roya Goodman FCPA (AU) MPA MBA (from Ponowi Village with presence in Australia, PNG, Solomon Islands, PNG, Tuvalu & Timor-Leste 1990-2021)

Communications and transportation
Ialibu is connected by roads to the rest of the world. Ialibu does have a certified airstrip which is yet to be operational. The nearest airports are Mendi and Mt Hagen, both about an hour from Ialibu Station. Radio stations are available and mobile phone and landline phones are provided by Telikom PNG and DIGICEL. The national television station, EM TV is broadcast throughout the Ialibu area.

Rivers
Rivers in Ialibu are: Yali, Yolo, Yalo (Mapele), Linege, Andowe and Ilge(Ice).

Sports
Popular sports in Ialibu are: Rugby league, Basketball, Volleyball and Touch Rugby.
Ialibu has produced many rugby league stars. The most notable ones are Raymond Karl, Nande Yer, Joe Rema, Francis Pegu, Mark Warua, Jessie Joe Parker, Dion Aiye, Philemon Kimisive and Justin Olam. They have all represented  Papua New Guinea as Kumuls.(Melbourne Storm's Justin Olam, playing in the NRL, is part Ialibu  and part Simbu).

Soccer has lost popularity since the 1980s.

Landmarks and attractions
The most significant landmark feature is the Telikom PNG telecommunication tower. It is situated in the middle of the administration center. It is also home to Mount Ialibu and Mount Giluwe, which the second highest mountain in Papua New Guinea and a tourist attraction.
So many other significant natural tourism attractions and natural flora and fauna within the vicinity of the central basin area maybe found in nearby geographical locations with close proximities.

Health and education
The Ialibu District Hospital offers services to the Ialibu, Pangia, Kagua and Erave people. There is only one general practitioner here despite the fact that there is position for two medical officers. There are several nursing staff at the hospital. the common illnesses seen at the hospital are medical conditions including pneumonia, tuberculosis, malaria, asthma, COAD, as well as other infective conditions. The hospital also provides paediatrics care and obstetrics care as well. Lifestyle diseases like essential hypertension and diabetes mellitus are a rising problem in this area. Major cases the GP cannot manage are referred by car to the Mt. Hagen General Hospital. The hospital is state run.

Schools in the district include, Ialibu Secondary School, St Clare Primary School, Kepi Technical Vocational Training Institute, Ialibu Admin Primary School and Ialibu Lutheran Community School.

Products  of Ialibu Secondary School include notable men and women like  Prime Minister Peter O'Neill, Brigadier General Gilbert Toropo, MP Pilla  Niningi, Jacob Iki, Aloysius Rema, Dr. Walipe Wingi, Dr. Pole Awei, Marley Undi, Dr. Kevin Pamba, Thomas Warua, Grace Warua, Maritha Warua, Dr Sam Kari, Mary Rema, Ruth Undi, Pat Matoli and many others currently in politics, in the Public Service, in the disciplinary forces, in the Private Sector and many  engaging private business.
   
Ialibu will be home to the newly proposed Western Pacific University. This is the initiative of the former Prime Minister of PNG Honourable Peter O'Neil who is one of the favourite sons of Ialibu. The University is built on traditional land belonging to the Pekai Aluwe (Koromi) tribe of Ialibu.

Climate
Ialibu has a subtropical highland climate (Cfb) with heavy to very heavy rainfall year-round.

Surrounding villages
The villages nearby Ialibu are Topopulu, Yameyame (Yamex), Yal-Kuli, Kapolga, Yamba, Mungure, Maroloma, Riwi& Aropa, Koromi, Lama, Pale, Yarena, Muli, Yate, Paipa, Ponowi, Iombi, Karanas, Isale, Epeanda Mungumapu, Mondada, Kendgal (Kendayamo), Yailte Palta, Polgopo, Konjo, Kuyopulu, Koraipe, Kengaro, Pilipili Island (PSP), Kokola, Pope,  Maral, Kalipine, Elgele, Kero, Kou, Kongibulg, Lipite, Pokorapulgu, Kirene, Kumbame, Pagipuru, Lepora, Walume, Pokale, Konapugl, Tirigipena, Oilge, Popurol, Karape Kaloli, Kume, Orei Kaupena, Yarepe and many more.

Main tribes surrounding the Ialibu township are Pekai Aluwe (Topopul, Koromi, Kapolga villages), Kauka Aluwe (Yameyame and Lama Sawmill villages) Rakili (Yamba, Lama Sawmill, Kemboli, Riro, Wangai, Yarena), Kepik/Kipurupa (Karanas, Aropa, Riwi, Kondeli, Yamonda, Lakira, Isale, Epeanda), Tangiki (Kendagl, Marapul, Kapipul, PSP), Makai (Walum, Kero, Kongibul),Yalipu Makai (Kokola), Warena (Kou, Kaupena), Ekai (Olga Pope, Mokapoi, Tilipunge, Marali, Kagoli Poine, Ilge No, Kalibine, Kaka, Elgele), Ekai (Muli), Ekai (Limbo) Koke (Maine Pope, Kokola), Pupai (Kendal, Polgopo) Kolgi (Kendal), Nemola (Ponowi), Marepa/Makai (Pale), Moi Marepa/Mokoi Makai (Pawia, Yarena), Walupape (Iate, Rawame, Nemola (Ponowi), Pouka.

The people from these places share the common local languages Imboungu and Kewabi. Imboungu is mainly spoken by central Ialibu and extends to Mt Hagen (Melpa) and Mendi (Mandi) whereas Kewabi is spoken by people living further east towards Kagua, Erave and Pangia Districts.

See also
Ialibu Urban LLG
Ialibu Basin Rural LLG

References

Populated places in Southern Highlands Province